The Organizatsiya Ukraïns'kykh Skautiv (Ukrainian Організація Українських Скаутів ОУС "Organization of Ukrainian Scouts", OUS) is a Scouting organization in Ukraine, a member of the Order of World Scouts.

After several unsuccessful attempts to join the World Federation of Independent Scouts (WFIS), the OUS became full member of the Order of World Scouts in April 2009.

Program sections
 Vovcheniata (Cub Scouts) – ages 6 to 9
 Skauty (Scouts) – ages 10 to 14
 Kadety (Cadettes -older members) – ages 15 – 18
 Roverskauty (Rovers) – ages 18+

Main principles

Loyalty to God and Ukraine
Duty to others and to itself
Obedience to the Scout law

Cub Scout Promise
I promise with all forces try to be faithful to God, my parents, my homeland, Ukraine, the Cub Scout Law and every day to make someone a good deed.

Cub Scout Law
 a Cub Scout loves Ukraine.
 a Cub Scout thinks of others first
 a Cub Scout has eyes and ears open (Cub Scout hears and sees all)
 a Cub Scout is always clean
 a Cub Scout always tells the truth
 a Cub Scout is always cheerful.

Scout Law
 Ukraine serves as a scout and performs in front of her his duties. 
 Word scout trust. 
 a Scout-poradlyvyy and helping others. 
 a Scout-all friend and brother of every other scout. 
 a Scout comes in a knight. 
 a Scout loves nature and tries to understand her. 
 a Scout-responsible and obedient to their parents and taught. 
 a Scout always has a good mood. 
 a Scout-economical and sacrificial. 
 a Scout-clean in thought, words and actions.

Scout Oath
In his honour I swear that I will do everything in my power to: 
Do my duty to God and the State, 
always help others 
obey the Scout Law.

References

External links

homepage of the Organizatsiya Ukraïns'kych Skautiv 
 old homepage of the OUS, now official website of the community of parents and friends of the OUS

Scouting and Guiding in Ukraine